Plou is a municipality located in the Province of Teruel, Aragon, Spain. According to the 2004 census (INE), the municipality has a population of 49 inhabitants.

The extinct plant genus Ploufolia was discovered in and named after the municipality.

Plou is also a common surname in the small community.

As of 2021, the town had 50 registered residents but only 24 year-round residents, including two school age children who travel to Montalbán for school.  The town declined in the 1960s with the closing a mining railway from Utrillas to Zaragoza, and more emigration to larger cities, mainly Zaragoza and Barcelona.

See also
List of municipalities in Teruel

References

Further reading
 

Municipalities in the Province of Teruel